Dasanami (IAST  "Tradition of Ten Names"), also known as the Order of Swamis, is a Hindu monastic tradition of "single-staff renunciation" (ēka daṇḍi saṃnyāsī) generally associated with the four cardinal mathas of the Advaita Vedanta tradition and, according to tradition, organized in its present form by Vedic scholar and teacher Adi Shankaracharya. 

A swami, as the monk is called, is a renunciate who seeks to achieve spiritual union with the swa (Self). In formally renouncing the world, he or she generally wears ochre, saffron or orange-colored robes as a symbol of non-attachment to worldly desires, and may choose to roam independently or join an ashram or other spiritual organizations, typically in an ideal of selfless service. Upon initiation, which can only be done by another existing Swami, the renunciate receives a new name (usually ending in ananda, meaning 'supreme bliss') and takes a title which formalizes his connection with one of the ten subdivisions of the Swami Order.  A swami's name has a dual significance, representing the attainment of supreme bliss through some divine quality or state (i.e. love, wisdom, service, yoga), and through a harmony with the infinite vastness of nature, expressed in one of the ten subdivision names: Giri (mountain), Puri (tract), Bhāratī (land), Vana (forest), Āraṇya (forest), Sagara (sea), Āśrama (spiritual exertion), Sarasvatī (wisdom of nature), Tīrtha (place of pilgrimage), and Parvata (mountain). A swami is not necessarily a yogi, although many swamis can and do practice yoga as a means of spiritual liberation; experienced swamis may also take disciples.

Daśanāmi Sannyāsins are associated mainly with the four cardinal maṭhas in four corners of India, said to be established by Adi Shankaracharya himself; however, the association of the Dasanāmis with the Shankara maṭhas remained nominal. The early swamis, elevated into the order as disciples of Shankara, were sannyāsins who embraced sannyasa either after marriage or without getting married.

Single-staff renunciates are distinct in their practices from Shaiva trishuladhari or "trident-wielding renunciates" and Vaishnava traditions of Tridandi sannyāsis.

History

Ēkadaṇḍis 
Ēkadandis were already known during what is sometimes referred to as "Golden Age of Hinduism" (ca. 320-650 CE)

Golden Age of Hinduism
See also Gupta rule and Gupta and Pallava period

The "Golden Age of Hinduism" (ca. 320-650 CE) flourished during the Gupta Empire (320 to 550 CE) until the fall of the Harsha (606 to 647 CE). During this period, power was centralized, along with a growth of long distance trade, standardization of legal procedures, and a general spread of literacy. Mahayana Buddhism flourished, but Shrauta Hinduism was rejuvenated by the patronage of the Gupta dynasty. The position of the Brahmans was reinforced and the first Hindu temples emerged during the late Gupta age. The Mahābhārata, which probably reached its final form by the early Gupta period (c. 4th century), already mentions "ēkadaṇḍi" and "tridaṇḍi".

Wandering Ēkadaṇḍi ascetics

The Ēkadaṇḍis existed in the Tamil country during the south-Indian Pandyan dynasty (3rd century BCE - 16th century CE) and the South-Indian Pallava dynasty (2nd - 9th centuries CE). Being wandering monastics, they were not settled in the brahmadeyas or settlement areas for Brahmins. There existed tax free bhiksha-bogams for feeding the Ēkadaṇḍi ascetics in the ancient Tamil country.

Ēkadaṇḍis and Tridandis were also active in Eastern India, and appear to have existed there during the North-Indian Gupta Empire (320 to 550 CE ).

According to R. Tirumalai, "There appears to have been no sectarian segregation of the Shaiva (Ēkadaṇḍi) and Srivaishnava (Tridandi Sannyāsins)".

Professor Kiyokazu Okita and Indologist B. N. K. Sharma says, Sannyasis in the lineage of Advaita of Adi Shankara and the Sannyasis in the lineage of Dvaita of Madhvacharya are all Ēkadaṇḍis.

Establishment of the Dasanami Sampradaya

At the beginning of what is referred to as "Late classical Hinduism", which lasted from 650 till 1100 CE, Shankara established the Dasanami Sampradaya.

Late-Classical Hinduism
See also Late-Classical Age and Hinduism Middle Ages

After the end of the Gupta Empire and the collapse of the Harsha Empire, power became decentralized in India. Several larger kingdoms emerged, with "countless vassal states": in the east the Pala Empire (770-1125 CE), in the west and north the Gurjara-Pratihara (7th-10th century), in the southwest the Rashtrakuta dynasty (752-973), in the Dekkhan the Chalukya dynasty (7th-8th century), and in the south the Pallava dynasty (7th-9th century) and the Chola dynasty (9th century).

The kingdoms were ruled via a feudal system. Smaller kingdoms were dependent on the protection of the larger kingdoms. "The great king was remote, was exalted and deified", as reflected in the Tantric Mandala, which could also depict the king as the centre of the mandala.

The disintegration of central power also lead to regionalization of religiosity, and religious rivalry. Local cults and languages were enhanced, and the influence of "Brahmanic ritualistic Hinduism" was diminished. Rural and devotional movements arose, along with Shaivism, Vaisnavism, Bhakti and Tantra, though "sectarian groupings were only at the beginning of their development". Religious movements had to compete for recognition by the local lords. Buddhism lost its position, and began to disappear in India.

Establishment

Shankara, himself considered to be an incarnation of Shiva, established the Daśanāmi Sampradaya, organizing a section of the Ēkadaṇḍi monastics under an umbrella grouping of ten names. Several other Hindu monastic and Ēkadaṇḍi traditions remained outside the organization of the Dasanāmis.

Adi Shankara organized the Hindu monastics of these ten sects or names under four maṭhas or monasteries, with headquarters at Dvārakā in the west, Jagannathadham Puri in the east, Sringeri in the south and Badrikashrama in the north. Each maṭha was headed by one of his four main disciples, who each continued the Vedanta Sampradaya.

Monastics of these ten orders differ in part in their beliefs and practices, and a section of them is not considered to be restricted to specific changes made by Shankara. While the Dasanāmis associated with the Shankara maṭhas follow the procedures enumerated by Adi Śankara, some of these orders remained partly or fully independent in their belief and practices; and outside the official control of the Shankara maṭhas.

The association of the Dasanāmis with the Smarta tradition or Advaita Vedānta is not all-embracing. One example is the Kriyā Yoga tradition that considers itself eclectic (see: Eclecticism), with ancient unchangeable beliefs, and outside the ambit of differences in the understanding of Vedanta. Other examples are the Tantric Avadhūta Sampradāyas and Ekadaṇḍi sannyāsa traditions outside the control of the Shankara maṭhas The Dasanāmis or Ēkadaṇḍis also founded, and continue to found or affiliate themselves with, maṭhas, ashrams and temples outside the control of the Shankara maṭhas.

The Advaita Sampradāya is not a Shaiva sect, despite the historical links with Shaivism:

Nevertheless, contemporary Shankaracaryas have more influence among Saiva communities than among Vaisnava communities. The greatest influence of the gurus of the Advaita tradition has been among followers of the Smartha tradition, who integrate the domestic Vedic ritual with devotional aspects of Hinduism.

According to Nakamura, these maṭhas contributed to the influence of Shankara, which was "due to institutional factors". The maṭhas which he built exist until today, and preserve the teachings and influence of Shankara, "while the writings of other scholars before him came to be forgotten with the passage of time".

The table below gives an overview of the four Amnaya maṭhas founded by Adi Shankara, and their details.

Expansion of the Dasanāmi Sampradāya
According to the tradition in Kerala, after Shankara's samādhi at Vadakkunnathan Temple, his disciples founded four maṭhas in Thrissur, namely Naduvil Madhom, Thekke Madhom, Idayil Madhom and Vadakke Madhom.

According to Pandey, the ēkadaṇḍis or Dasanāmis had established monasteries in India and Nepal in the 13th and 14th century.

Naga Sadhus akharas

In the 16th century, Madhusudana Saraswati of Bengal organised a section of the Naga (naked) tradition of armed sannyasis in order to protect Hindus from the tyranny of the Mughal rulers. 

Warrior-ascetics could be found in Hinduism from at least the 1500s and as late as the 1700s, although tradition attributes their creation to Sankaracharya

Some examples of Akhara currently are the Juna Akhara of the Dashanami Naga, Niranjani Akhara, Anand Akhara, Atal Akhara, Awahan Akhara, Agni Akhara and Nirmal Panchayati Akhara at Prayagraj. Each akhara is divided into sub-branches and traditions. An example is the Dattatreya Akhara (Ujjain) of the naked sadhus of Juna Naga establishment.

The naga sadhus generally remain in the ambit of non-violence presently, though some sections are also known to practice the sport of Indian wrestling. The Dasanāmi sannyāsins practice the Vedic and yogic Yama principles of ahimsā (non-violence), satya (truth), asteya (non-stealing), aparigraha (non-covetousness) and brahmacārya (celibacy / moderation).

The naga sadhus are prominent at Kumbh mela, where the order in which they enter the water is fixed by tradition. After the Juna akhara, the Niranjani and Mahanirvani Akhara proceed to their bath. Ramakrishna Math Sevashram are almost the last in the procession.

Characteristics

Parampara

In the Indian religious and philosophical traditions, all knowledge is traced back to the gods and to the Rishis who primarily received the Vedas as revelations.

The current Acaryas, the heads of the maṭhas, trace their authority back to the four main disciples of Shankara, and each of the heads of these four maṭhas takes the title of Shankaracharya ("the learned Shankara") after Adi Shankara.

The Advaita guru-paramparā (Lineage of Gurus in Non-dualism) begins with the mythological time of the Daiva-paramparā, followed by the vedic seers of the Ṛṣi-paramparā, and the Mānava-paramparā of historical times and personalities:

Daiva-paramparā
 Nārāyaṇa
 Sada Shiva
 Padmabhuva (Brahmā)
Ṛṣi-paramparā
Vaśiṣṭha
 Śakti
Parāśara
Vyāsa
Śuka
Mānava-paramparā
Gauḍapāda
Govinda bhagavatpāda
Śankara bhagavatpāda, and then Shankara's four disciples
Padmapāda
Hastāmalaka
Toṭaka
 Vārtikakāra (Sureśvara) and others

Ten Names
Hindus who enter sannyāsa in the ēkadaṇḍi tradition take up one of the ten names associated with this Sampradaya: Giri, Puri, Bhāratī, Vana/Ban, Āraṇya, Sagara, Āśrama, Sarasvatī, Tīrtha, and Parvata. Sanyasis of Advaita Vedanta and Dvaita Vedanta belong to ēkadaṇḍi tradition.

Standardised List of Dasanāmīs in Wikipedia
This section enumerates, in standardised manner, members of the Dasanāmī Order with articles in Wikipedia, listing each under his formal title and name, without the use of the honorifics used by devotees and disciples. The word "Swāmī" here is not an honorific. It is the title of an initiated member of the Dasanāmī Order. Entries are listed in standard form: TITLE (Swāmī) +  PERSONAL NAME + SUB-ORDER NAME. A few entries have the additional title (not honorific) of "Jagadguru Śankarācārya" which designates either one of the four supreme leaders of the order (somewhat similar to the position of Pope in Catholic Christianity). "Mahanta" is an administrative title designating an organizational position or office assigned to certain persons.

A

B

C

D

G

H

I

J

K

L

M

N

O

P

R

S

T

V

Y

Notes

References

Written references

Web-references

Bibliography

Sources

External links
 Sringeri Math
 advaita-vedanta.org, Danasami Sampradya- The monastic tradition
 Devasthanam, The Monastic Tradition

Hindu denominations
Hindu monasticism
Hindu religious orders
Smarta tradition
Advaita Vedanta